Georges Roes (3 March 1889 – 14 May 1945) was a French sport shooter. He was born in Tarbes. He won silver medals at the 1920 Summer Olympics and at the 1924 Summer Olympics.

References

1889 births
1945 deaths
Sportspeople from Tarbes
French male sport shooters
Olympic shooters of France
Olympic silver medalists for France
Shooters at the 1920 Summer Olympics
Shooters at the 1924 Summer Olympics
Olympic medalists in shooting
Medalists at the 1920 Summer Olympics
Medalists at the 1924 Summer Olympics
20th-century French people